The Leibniz Supercomputing Centre (LRZ) is a supercomputing centre on the Campus Garching near Munich, operated by the Bavarian Academy of Sciences and Humanities.

The centre is named after Gottfried Wilhelm Leibniz.

SuperMUC 

The Leibniz Supercomputing Centre operated SuperMUC, which was the fastest European supercomputer when it entered operation in 2012 and was ranked #9 in the TOP500 list of the world's fastest supercomputers. It has since been superseded by the more powerful SuperMUC-NG.

References

External links 
 
 

Research institutes in Germany
Supercomputer sites